Arenzville is a village in Cass County, Illinois, United States. The population was 367 at the 2020 census.

Geography

Demographics

As of the 2020 census there were 367 people, 151 households, and 107 families residing in the village. The racial makeup of the village was 94.28% White, 0.27% African American, 0.27% Pacific Islander, 1.36% from other races, and 3.81% from two or more races. Hispanic or Latino of any race were 3.54% of the population.

There were 151 households, out of which 77.48% had children under the age of 18 living with them, 62.91% were married couples living together, 3.31% had a female householder with no husband present, and 29.14% were non-families. 23.84% of all households were made up of individuals, and 7.28% had someone living alone who was 65 years of age or older. The average household size was 3.19 and the average family size was 2.65.

The village's age distribution consisted of 30.3% under the age of 18, 3.8% from 18 to 24, 26.7% from 25 to 44, 21.1% from 45 to 64, and 18.5% who were 65 years of age or older. The median age was 37.7 years. For every 100 females, there were 99.0 males. For every 100 females age 18 and over, there were 97.9 males.

The median income for a household in the village was $81,250, and the median income for a family was $86,875. Males had a median income of $51,750 versus $33,214 for females. The per capita income for the village was $30,825. About 1.9% of families and 4.5% of the population were below the poverty line, including none of those under age 18 and 1.4% of those age 65 or over.

References

Villages in Cass County, Illinois
Villages in Illinois